Brae is a restaurant in Birregurra, Victoria, Australia. It was named at number 44 in The World's 50 Best Restaurants, 2017.

Brae is owned and operated by Dan Hunter, who had previously worked at Mugaritz in Spain and the Royal Mail Restaurant in Dunkeld, Victoria. Brae opened in December 2013.

Brae's menu is driven by its organic kitchen garden, and its menu changes according to seasonal variation. Its signature dish is a parsnip and apple dessert: a "funnel of fried parsnip skin housing a creamy apple-parsnip mousse".

References

External links

Restaurants in Victoria (Australia)
Restaurants established in 2013